Mohana Singh Jitarwal is one of the first female fighter pilots of India. She was declared as the first female combat pilot along with two of her cohort, Bhawana Kanth, and Avani Chaturvedi. All three women pilots were inducted into the Indian Air Force fighter squadron in June 2016. They were formally commissioned by Defence Minister Manohar Parrikar. After the government of India decided to open the fighter stream in India Air Force for women on an experimental basis, these three women were the first to be selected for the program.

Biography

Mohana Singh completed her schooling from The Air Force School, New Delhi and BTech in Electronics & Communication from Global Institute of Management and Emerging Technologies, Amritsar, Punjab. Her father Pratap Singh is a serving Indian Air Force personnel and mother Manju Singh is a teacher. While growing up, Singh was fond of sports like roller skating, badminton and other activities like singing and painting.

On 9 March 2020, she was awarded with Nari Shakti Puraskar by President Ram Nath Kovind.

Career

In June 2019, she became the first women fighter pilot of Indian Air Force to become a fully operational by day on a Hawk Mk.132 advance jet trainer. She had completed more than 380 hours of incident free flying on Hawk Mk.132 with training in both Air-to-Air and Air-to-Ground fighting mode in 2019.

References

Further reading 

 Women Fighter Pilots. Veer by Discovery

Living people
1992 births
Indian women aviators
Women from Punjab, India
People from Jhunjhunu district
Nari Shakti Puraskar winners
Indian Air Force personnel
Indian women in war